The Monte Incudine massif is a chain of mountains in the south of the island of Corsica, France.
It takes its name from Monte Incudine, the highest peak.

Location
The Monte Incudine massif is the southernmost of the four largest blocks of mountains in Corsica, the others being (from north to south), the Monte Cinto massif, monte Rotondo massif and Monte Renoso massif.
These massifs form the Corse cristalline, mainly composed of magmatic rocks such as granites, granulites,
porphyries and rhyolites.
The Monte Incudine massif dominates the Sartenais and extends south to the Cagna mountain.

Peaks

The main peaks are,

See also
List of mountains in Corsica by height

Notes

Sources

Mountains of Haute-Corse
Mountains of Corse-du-Sud
Massifs of Corsica